Shitanshu Hargovindbhai Kotak (born 19 October 1972 in Rajkot) is an Indian retired first-class cricketer and coach.

Playing career
A left-handed batsman, he has been a prolific run scorer for Saurashtra. He scored 8061 runs in 130 first class match with average of 41.76. He also took 70 wickets while playing for Saurastra.

Coaching career
As head coach, He led Saurashtra to the victory in the 2020 Ranji Trophy Final. After the appointment of Rahul Dravid as the head of the National Cricket Academy in August 2019, Kotak was appointed as Dravid's successor as the head coach of the India A team.

External links
 

1972 births
Living people
Saurashtra cricketers
West Zone cricketers
Warwickshire Cricket Board cricketers
Indian cricket coaches
Indian cricketers